John Duncan McPhee (June 21, 1894 – December 2, 1953) was a physician and politician in Ontario, Canada. He represented Simcoe East in the Legislative Assembly of Ontario from 1943 to 1953 as a Conservative.

The son of William Robert McPhee and Martha Hannah Hart, he was born in Atherley, Mara township and was educated in Orillia and at the University of Toronto. In 1915, McPhee married Kathleen Marie Robertson. He served as medical health officer, reeve, councillor and school board member.

References

External links

1894 births
1953 deaths
Progressive Conservative Party of Ontario MPPs
20th-century Canadian physicians